The 2018 London Broncos season was the 39th in the club's history, their fourth consecutive campaign out of the Super League and the third since moving to Ealing and the Trailfinders Sports Ground.

Competing in the 2018 Betfred Championship and the 2018 Ladbrokes Challenge Cup, the club was coached by Danny Ward, ending the regular league season in second place behind the Toronto Wolfpack, thereby qualifying for the 2018 Super League Qualifiers.

The London Broncos finished in fifth position at the end of the seven match qualifying series, earning themselves a place in the Million Pound Game and a trip to Canada to play Toronto Wolfpack, and the on-field season concluded with a sensational victory and promotion back to the European Super League, Rugby League's top flight in the Northern Hemisphere, for the 2019 season.

Year Review

January
Pre-season preparations conclude with two away fixtures, a close victory at Betfred Championship 1 side, Doncaster 22–16 in freezing snowy conditions, followed by a narrow 18–24 loss at Betfred Super League outfit, Hull Kingston Rovers.

February
The Broncos begin the sponsored Betfred Championship season in fine style by winning their opening four fixtures, three of them at home.

Barrow Raiders are dispatched 56–12 on the season's opening day following a masterful man of the match display by James Meadows on debut, and following a hard-fought 12–0 away success at Dewsbury Rams, Eddie Battye and Jarrod Sammut the try scorers, two further home victories over traditional rivals, Featherstone Rovers and the much fancied Toronto Wolfpack see the London-based outfit top the early season table.

March
The month begins in freezing conditions, courtesy of the Beast from the East, which results in the Broncos' Round 5 fixture at Sheffield Eagles being postponed on 4 March.

The Broncos record a fifth straight championship victory the following weekend however, defeating Batley Bulldogs 68–12 in a twelve try blitz at Trailfinders Sports Ground in front of a crowd of 1,200. Kieran Dixon bags four tries, and there are braces for Api Pewhairangi and Rhys Williams.

The Broncos commence their Ladbrokes Challenge Cup campaign seven days later with a long trip to Betfred Championship 1 club, Workington Town, and a close encounter sees the Londoners emerge victorious 22–20, Rhys Williams repeats the feat of seven days previous with a try double, and Api Pewhairangi and Tom Spencer also cross the chalk line for Danny Ward's side.

The midweek Ladbrokes Challenge Cup draw pits the Broncos with a tough looking trip to a revitalised Leigh Centurions, the former Betfred Super League outfit recovering form after an inauspicious start to life back in the Betfred Championship.

The last Sunday of the month has the Broncos travelling north to Heywood Road, home of struggling Swinton Lions and the visitors record a thumping 64–18 win to reassert their authority at the top of the championship table. The twelve try rout sees a hat-trick for Alex Walker and doubles for Kieran Dixon and James Cunningham. James Meadows, Will Lovell and Lewis Bienek also grab four-pointers to further emphasis the growing influence of the London produced players while Tom Spencer and Ben Hellewell complete the scoring.

Good Friday sees the visit of Sylvain Houles' Toulouse Olympique, and despite an early score by captain, Jay Pitts, the hosts struggle in the extremely wet conditions and subside to a first league defeat of the campaign, the French side running out easy 36-16 victors.

April
In a precursor to the upcoming 5th round Ladbrokes Challenge Cup tie later in the month the Broncos complete their Easter programme at Leigh Centurions. A hard-fought encounter on Bank Holiday Monday in front of 3, 328 sees Danny Ward's men just come up short, tries from Elliot Kear, James Cunningham and Matty Gee not enough to prevent a second defeat inside four days as the improving hosts record a fourth straight championship victory.

Another tough day at the office ensued six days later, as a trip to Halifax R.L.F.C. results in a third defeat in as many games, the Broncos unable to take advantage of the hosts twice being reduced to 12 men in a feisty encounter, eventually losing 16–26 to Richard Marshall's Shaymen.

The Broncos in need of a return to winning ways, travelled to Rochdale Hornets on the following Friday and returned south with two valuable points. Kieran Dixon led the way with a treble added to by a Sadiq Adebiyi brace, scores sufficient to see the Broncos victorious 30–15 on an extremely wet evening at the Crown Oil Arena.

A return to Lancashire and the Leigh Centurions the following weekend proves less fruitful, a below par performance ends with the Londoners crashing out of the Ladbrokes Challenge Cup 0-40.

The month is completed with a comfortable eleven try home win over lowly Dewsbury Rams, the mercurial Jarrod Sammut contributing 29 points, three tries and ten goals in a 64-6 success.

May
The early May Bank holiday weekend has the Broncos play host to familiar foes, in the shape of Leigh Centurions, and despite a fantastic effort in sweltering conditions the home side fall to a third defeat by Kieron Purtill's Leigh Centurions team inside five weeks. An absorbing encounter in front of a season's best crowd to date of 1, 340 has the spectators on the edge of their seats, tries from Rhys Williams, Alex Walker, Matty Gee, James Meadows and Sadiq Adebiyi not quite enough to prevent a 30-40 reverse and a slide to fourth place in the Betfred Championship table.

The next two weekend's see the Broncos rack up 112 points in two victories over Sheffield Eagles, the first, the postponed Round 5 fixture. The month ends with a first defeat at the Summer Bash as Toulouse Olympique again prove too strong for the Broncos who lose 28–40 in sunny Blackpool, despite tries from Jarrod Sammut, captain Jay Pitts, Ben Evans and two from Rhys Williams.

June

With a week off due to the Ladbrokes Challenge Cup quarter-finals the Broncos have time to re-group, ahead of their first ever trans-atlantic fixture at Betfred Championship  leaders, Toronto Wolfpack. The hosts, backed by a crowd of 7, 384 are intent on avenging their only league defeat of the season back in February, and prove difficult opponents, tries from Jarrod Sammut and Elliot Kear unable to prevent a 12–32 loss, a result that sees the Broncos drop out of the top four.

Lowly Rochdale Hornets and Swinton Lions visit Trailfinders Sports Ground before month end, and Danny Ward's team regain their form with two impressive victories, a regular season's best 68–0 against the former, and an equally convincing 58–22 over the latter.

July
The race for the top four is as red hot as the 2018 British Isles Heat Wave, and the competition remains fierce with six teams firmly in the hunt ahead of the last five fixtures. Toronto Wolfpack are seemingly secure at the head of the table, but the other five clubs, Toulouse Olympique, Featherstone Rovers, Halifax R.L.F.C., Leigh Centurions and the Broncos all hold genuine aspirations of securing a place in the Super League Qualifiers ahead of the mid-season break.

The Londoners, with a tough looking run-in, remain firmly in contention in fifth place and continue their charge with a 38–16 triumph at Batley Bulldogs, a brace from Rhys Williams, and further efforts from Api Pewhairangi, Matty Gee, Jay Pitts and Kieran Dixon enough to secure the points against Matt Diskin's side.

A third match up of the campaign against Toulouse Olympique sees the teams share forty points. In temperatures reaching 33c the Broncos fight back from 12 to 20 down to grab a point in the game's last quarter, an Eddie Battye try is converted by Kieran Dixon, who then kicks a 75th minute pressured penalty to secure a potentially vital point in France.

The Broncos host Halifax R.L.F.C. the following weekend, and in another tight encounter, the home side gain a narrow and important 20–18 win, courtesy of tries by the prolific Rhys Williams who crosses the whitewash twice, Alex Walker and Ben Evans. The result returns the Broncos to the top four ahead of a pivotal fixture away to third placed Featherstone Rovers seven days later, and despite trailing 0–7 at the break, the Broncos roar back in the second stanza, tries from Kieran Dixon, Jarrod Sammut and Alex Walker enough to earn a 14-7 come from behind victory.

The season defining win crucially leaves the fate of the Broncos in their own hands going into their final game of the regular campaign, a trip to Craven Park, Barrow-in-Furness, home of Barrow Raiders. A crushing thirteen try 72–6 rout of the Cumbrians secures a place in the Super League Qualifiers, and second spot in the Betfred Championship for the third successive season behind winners, Toronto Wolfpack. The Broncos can now look forward to four home games in the Super League Qualifiers and just edge out Toulouse Olympique and Halifax R.L.F.C. on points difference with Featherstone Rovers and Leigh Centurions consigned to the Championship Shield.

August
The Broncos kick-off the Super League Qualifiers with a fixture at Widnes Vikings in front of the Thursday evening Sky Sports cameras. Trailing 0–6 at the break Danny Ward's men produce a stunning second half performance to earn a dramatic 21-20 come from behind victory. Mark Ioane crosses early in the second half to reduce the arrears, and despite falling 4-14 behind, 3 tries in nine minutes from Daniel Harrison and a Kieran Dixon double, the second a 70-metre interception, puts the Londoners 20-14 ahead. The hosts level in a tense finale, only for Jarrod Sammut to win it for the London Broncos with a long range field goal in the dying seconds of a riveting contest.

The Broncos entertain current Super League champions, Leeds Rhinos in Round 2, and a season's best home crowd of 1,904 witness an entertaining encounter with the Broncos registering 22 unanswered second half points, although these are not enough to prevent a 32–48 defeat. A brave effort sees Rhys Williams bag another brace while there is a first professional try for Daniel Hindmarsh. Kieran Dixon and Ben Hellewell also cross the chalk-line in their 100th appearances for the club.

September

The London Broncos begin the month and continuation of their Super League Qualifiers campaign seven days after Catalans Dragons historic 2018 Challenge Cup Wembley success with a second trip of the season to Canada, and a fixture with Toronto Wolfpack. A scintillating four try blitz inside eight second half minutes is unable to prevent Danny Ward's men from falling to a 22-34 reversal in front of a partisan crowd of 7,557 the prolific Rhys Williams and Kieran Dixon add to their season's try tally and there are also four pointers for Alex Walker and Ben Evans.

The London Broncos play host to fellow Betfred Championship side, Toulouse Olympique eight days later in a crucial fourth out of seven Super League Qualifiers fixture, and a season's best display results in Danny Ward's men run out convincing 34-8 victors, a success that sees the Londoners leapfrog their French counterparts in the table and into a Million Pound Game position. Alex Walker bags a try double, to reach 20 for the season, whilst there are further tries from James Cunningham, Kieran Dixon and Ben Hellewell, the latter two stirring length of the field interception efforts.

Game 5 of the qualifiers campaign saw the London Broncos travel to familiar foes, Hull Kingston Rovers, and despite a gutsy display on Yorkshire's east coast, the Southerners came up short, on the wrong end of an 18–30 score line. The irrepressible Jarrod Sammut reached 20 tries for the season to draw the Londoners level early on, and although Matty Gee and Michael Channing added second half four pointers, these were not enough to secure the spoils for the Broncos who dropped out of the Million Pound Game positions as a consequence. The Broncos returned home to host Salford Red Devils seven days later, the match moved forward 24 hours at the behest of the Rugby Football League (RFL) to accommodate broadcast partner, Sky Sports' scheduling of the final round of fixtures the following week. In one of the most memorable games seen in the Capital in recent times, the Londoners emerged victorious 11-8 after a titanic battle against their Betfred Super League opponents. The heavens had opened mid morning and continued long into the night, but the inclement weather failed to deter captain, Jay Pitts who scored the home side's only try of the afternoon with a close-range effort after 14 minutes. Thereafter, a combination of heroic defence and the ever-reliable kicking boot of Jarrod Sammut, was enough to see Danny Ward’s team secure two crucial points, and leave their promotion aspirations very much alive with one game of the Super League Qualifiers, at home to Halifax, remaining.

Much conjecture during the week's build up to the final match had centred on whether the Londoners could qualify, and then secure a home fixture in the Million Pound Game. Results in the 48 hours preceding the contest would have a major bearing on the outcome and close challengers, Toulouse Olympique's loss at Salford Red Devils on the Thursday evening greatly improved the chances of Danny Ward’s men making the end of season finale, although Toronto Wolfpack’s stunning 17-16 success over fallen champions, Leeds Rhinos at Headingley a day later, meant the Londoners were almost certain to have to travel. The Broncos had to avoid an unlikely 24 point defeat at Trailfinders Sports Ground on the Saturday evening to ensure qualification, a feat they achieved as a Jarrod Sammut inspired display was enough to see the southern based outfit earn a come from behind victory. The triumph was not without a hiccup though as Richard Marshall’s valiant West Yorkshiremen raced into an early twelve point lead before tries from Jarrod Sammut and Éloi Pélissier prior to the interval, the latter with his first for the club, and second half efforts from Kieran Dixon and Elliot Kear secured a 23–18 win, fifth position in the final table and an away berth in the Million Pound Game. Destination of travel was confirmed 24 hours later, as Hull Kingston Rovers’s 30–0 triumph over already relegated Widnes Vikings ensured their Super League status, leaving the London Broncos searching for their passports ahead of a trip back to the land of the Maple Leaf for the third time in 2018 to play Paul Rowley's Toronto Wolfpack on Canada Thanksgiving Sunday.

October

The London Broncos returned to the Betfred sponsored Super League after an absence of four years, with a stunning 4–2 victory against the Toronto Wolfpack in the Million Pound Game.
In an enthralling try-less game, the Broncos emerged victorious thanks to a superb collective defensive display by Danny Ward’s men and the boot of Jarrod Sammut. 
 
The ever reliable Jarrod Sammut kicked a goal in each half to silence an overwhelming majority of a record 9, 266 franchise crowd, and although the hosts' Gareth O’Brien, hero for the Salford Red Devils in the same fixture in 2016, had managed to cancel out the Australian born Maltese International's first half effort, his attempt to level for a second time from distance in the 69th minute of an absorbing contest missed narrowly, and thereafter the Londoners held out in thrilling fashion to celebrate a tense and well deserved win to spark wild on-field celebrations in Canada, and off-field at the Trailfinders Sports Ground where supporters had watched the match live on a big screen in the main bar.

The team that won promotion back to Super League: Alex Walker, Kieran Dixon, Ben Hellewell, Elliot Kear, Rhys Williams, Jay Pitts, Jarrod Sammut, Ben Evans, Éloi Pélissier, Mark Ioane, Matty Gee, Will Lovell, Daniel Hindmarsh. Interchange: Tom Spencer, Eddie Battye, Rob Butler, Matty Davies. Head Coach: Danny Ward, Assistant Jamie Langley. Home-grown fullback Alex Walker, who dislocated three fingers, breaking one of them in the first minute, was named man of the match for an outstanding performance, capped by a stunning last-ditch tackle to deny Toronto Wolfpack's Blake Wallace late on as the Broncos held firm to secure a famous win.

The end of the month saw a raft of players join the club as the London Broncos began their preparations for a return to the Betfred Super League. Matty Fozard, Nathan Mason and Greg Richards joined Éloi Pélissier in signing for Danny Ward’s men, the latter having played an influential part in the Londoners play-off promotion success, whilst James Cunningham and Elliot Kear agreed contracts to remain with the London-based outfit.

November

The month begins with the capture of Jordan Abdull from fellow Super League club, Hull FC, and Gideon Boafo signing his first full time professional contract with club after excelling with the London Broncos Academy.

The eagerly awaited 2019 Betfred Super League fixtures are released on the first Tuesday of the month, with the London Broncos scheduled to host Wakefield Trinity on the opening weekend of the new season.

In further off season transfer activity the London Broncos capture the signature of St. Helens ; Ryan Morgan on a season long loan, while the month ends with goodbye's to Jarrod Sammut, Tom Spencer and Ben Evans who all leave the club after playing pivotal roles in helping the Southerners regain their Betfred Super League status.

London Broncos confirm their first pre-season fixture of 2019, and will travel to Betfred League 1 outfit, Doncaster R.L.F.C. on 20 January.

December
A quiet end to the year sees the London Broncos capture the signature of Luke Yates from NRL club, Newcastle Knights.

Milestones

February
Danny Ward took charge of his first professional game with a 56–12 victory over the Barrow Raiders.
James Meadows made his professional debut in the round 1 victory over the Barrow Raiders.
Sam Davis made his professional debut in the round 1 victory over the Barrow Raiders.
Daniel Harrison played in his 100th professional game with the round 1 victory over the Barrow Raiders.
Jordan Johnstone joined on loan, and made his Broncos debut in the victory over the Dewsbury Rams in Round 2 of the Championship.
Matty Fleming made his first start for London in the round 3 victory over Featherstone Rovers.
Rob Butler made his professional debut in the round 4 victory over the Toronto Wolfpack.

March
The round 5 fixture against the Sheffield Eagles was cancelled due to weather.
Jordan Johnstone returned to parent club Widnes after the completion of his loan spell.
James Cunningham called up to the England Knights Performance Squad.
Sam Davis scored his first try in the professional game during the round 6 victory over Batley Bulldogs.
Kam Pearce-Paul joins the Coventry Bears on a months loan deal.
Jamaican international Jacob Ogden made his first appearance in the professional game, debuting for London in Round 4 of the Challenge Cup.
Dan Hindmarsh made his professional debut for the London Broncos in Round 4 of the Challenge Cup.
Lewis Bienek signed a three and a half year contract with Hull F.C. He was immediately loaned back to the Broncos for the remainder of the season.
Rhys Williams played his 100th consecutive game for the London Broncos.
James Meadows scored his first try in the professional game during the round 7 victory over Swinton Lions.
Toulouse Olympique's win over the Broncos saw London lose their 100% start to the season and was the first defeat in Wards coaching career.
Eddie Battye played his 50th game for London in the defeat against Toulouse Olympique.

April
The Broncos were knocked out of the Challenge Cup in the fifth round by the Leigh Centurions.
Matt Davies made his professional debut in the Round 12 victory over the Dewsbury Rams.

May
Lewis Bienek ended his loan period back at the Broncos and returned to Hull F.C.

June
The Broncos played their first ever trans-atlantic fixture in the defeat by the Toronto Wolfpack.
The 68-0 drubbing of Rochdale Hornets was London's biggest win of the regular season, and largest ever points difference win in the Championship for the club.
Matt Davis signs for Warrington Wolves on a two-year contract, starting in 2019.

July
Daymeric Pelo joined from Limoux and signed a deal until the end of the 2018 season.
Éloi Pélissier joined from the Lézignan Sangliers and signed a deal until the end of the 2018 season.
The 72–6 victory over the Barrow Raiders represented the Broncos biggest ever away win in the Championship.
London Broncos finished the regular Championship season as runners up, and earned a place in the Super League Qualifiers.
The Broncos were the top points scorers in the Championship, scoring 907 points in their 23 regular season games, at an average of nearly 40 points per game.

August
The Broncos 21–20 victory  over Widnes in the opening game of the Super League Qualifiers was their first against Super League opposition since defeating Salford Red Devils 19–16 at the Salford City Stadium in the 2016 Super 8s
Api Pewhairangi played his 50th game for the Broncos in the Super League Qualifiers victory over the Widnes Vikings
Kieran Dixon made his 100th appearance for the Broncos in the Super League Qualifiers fixture against Leeds Rhinos
Ben Hellewell also made his 100th appearance for the Broncos in the Super League Qualifiers fixture against Leeds Rhinos
Daniel Hindmarsh scored his first professional try for the Broncos in the Super League Qualifiers fixture against Leeds Rhinos
The London Broncos attracted their highest attendance of the season to date, 1, 904 for the Super League Qualifiers Round 2 fixture versus Leeds Rhinos
Kieran Dixon who recently made his 100th appearance for the Broncos signed a new two-year contract with the Londoners
Eddie Battye signed a new one-year contract with the Trailfinders Sports Ground based outfit

September
Jarrod Sammut reached 100 goals for the season when converting his fourth of seven goals in the Super League Qualifiers fixture against Toulouse Olympique
Alex Walker reached 20 tries for the campaign with a brace in the Super League Qualifiers fixture against Toulouse Olympique
Elliot Kear made his 100th appearance for the London Broncos in the Super League Qualifiers fixture against Hull Kingston Rovers
Jarrod Sammut reached 20 tries for the season with the opener in the Super League Qualifiers match versus Hull Kingston Rovers
Danny Ward in his first year as coach of London Broncos was voted the Betfred Championship Coach of the Year
 London Broncos were this year's winners of the Project of the Year Award for Betfred Championship and Betfred League 1 for their alliance with Featherstone School Sports Partnership delivering programmes within primary schools in Ealing to improve numeracy and literacy and emotional and physical wellbeing. The Project of the Year award recognises a club across both leagues who has shown an outstanding commitment to meeting the objectives of raising the visibility and profile of the competition and increasing attendance at one or more games through a special project.
London Broncos ended their Super League Qualifiers campaign in fifth position with a home victory over Halifax, which earned them a place in the Million Pound Game

October
Michael Channing announced his early retirement from the game through a neck injury
Will Lovell made his 50th appearance for London Broncos in the Million Pound Game against Toronto Wolfpack
London Broncos returned to the Betfred sponsored Super League on Sunday 7 October 2018 after an absence of four years with victory in the Million Pound Game versus Toronto Wolfpack at the Lamport Stadium
Six London produced players featured in the Million Pound Game victory over the Toronto Wolfpack; Alex Walker, Kieran Dixon, Will Lovell, Daniel Hindmarsh, Rob Butler, and Matty Davies
Matty Fozard signed for the London Broncos on a two-year contract from Betfred Championship club, Sheffield Eagles.
James Cunningham penned a one-year deal with the London Broncos keeping him at the club until the end of the 2019 season.
Elliot Kear agreed a new one-year contract to keep him at the London Broncos for the 2019 Betfred Super League campaign.
Éloi Pélissier signed a one-year deal with the London Broncos, keeping him at the club for the 2019 season.
Nathan Mason joined the London Broncos on a two-year contract from fellow Betfred Super League club, Huddersfield Giants
Greg Richards signed for the London Broncos on a two-year contract following his release from Betfred Championship club, Leigh Centurions earlier this year

November
Matt Davies signed a one-year full time contract after featuring eight times for the London Broncos during the 2018 campaign whilst on an apprenticeship contract working with the London Rugby League Foundation and the Broncos Community programme.
Jordan Abdull joined the London Broncos on a one-year deal from fellow Super League club, Hull FC.
Gideon Boafo signed his first full time professional contract with club after excelling with the London Broncos Academy.
Ryan Morgan joined the London Broncos on-loan from St. Helens for the 2019 Betfred Super League season.
Ben Evans departs the Londoners and joins Betfred Championship outfit, Toulouse Olympique
Tom Spencer ends his association with the London Broncos and signs for Betfred Championship club, Leigh Centurions
Jarrod Sammut leaves the London Broncos for personal reasons and signs a two-year contract with Wigan Warriors

December
London Broncos secure the signature of Luke Yates from NRL club, Newcastle Knights

2018 tables

Betfred Championship - Regular Season

Super League Qualifiers - Super 8s

Fixtures and Results (Broncos Score First)

Preseason

Betfred Championship

The Super League Qualifiers - Super 8s

The Million Pound Game

Ladbrokes Challenge Cup

Player Appearances

Betfred Championship

Notes

The Super League Qualifiers - Super 8s & Million Pound Game

Ladbrokes Challenge Cup

Squad Statistics

 Appearances and Points include (Betfred Championship, Ladbrokes Challenge Cup, Super League Qualifiers and the Million Pound Game) as of 8 October 2018.

Notes

Tale of the Tape

Most Points in a Game 
34, Round 5: Jarrod Sammut vs. Sheffield Eagles (3 tries & 11 Goals)

Most tries in a Game
4, Round 6: Kieran Dixon vs. Batley Bulldogs

Highest score in a winning game
72, Round 23: vs. Barrow Raiders

Lowest score in a winning game
4, Million Pound Game: vs. Toronto Wolfpack

Greatest winning margin
68, Round 17: vs. Rochdale Hornets

Greatest number of games won consecutively
7, Round 1 to Round 7 (The Round 5 away fixture at Sheffield Eagles on 4 March was postponed and rescheduled for later in the season). Includes the win at Workington Town in Challenge Cup Round 4

Highest score in a losing game
32, Super League Qualifiers Round 2: vs. Leeds Rhinos

Lowest score in a losing game
0, Challenge Cup Round 5: vs. Leigh Centurions

Greatest losing margin
40, Challenge Cup Round 5: vs. Leigh Centurions

Greatest number of games lost consecutively
3, Round 8 to Round 10

Transfers

In

Out

Awards

Trophy Cabinet
Million Pound Game Trophy

London Broncos Awards Night
Held at Doubletree by Hilton Hotel, London-Ealing on Tuesday 9 October.

 London Broncos Men of Steel: Jay Pitts and Rhys Williams
 London Broncos Chairmans Player of the Year: Alex Walker
 London Broncos Players Player of the Year: Matt Davis
 London Broncos Young Player of the Year: Daniel Hindmarsh

References

External links
londonbroncosrl.com

2018 in rugby league by club
2018 in English rugby league
London Broncos seasons
London Broncos season